The Rising of the Moon is a 1957 Irish anthology film directed by John Ford.  It consists of three episodes all set in Ireland:

"The Majesty of the Law", based on the short story of that title by Frank O'Connor in Bones of Contention
"A Minute's Wait", based on a 1914 one-act comedy by Martin J. McHugh
"1921", based on the play The Rising of the Moon by Lady Gregory.

Plot

The Majesty of the Law
Police Inspector Dillon (Cyril Cusack) reluctantly sets out walking through the countryside to see an old friend, Dan O'Flaherty (Noel Purcell). Along the way, he encounters Mickey J. (Jack MacGowran), a poitín maker (bootlegger) who is not Dillon's target, but accompanies Dillon to O'Flaherty's stone cottage where Dillon serves O'Flaherty a warrant for striking Phelim O'Feeney. While they are all congenially drinking and socializing inside O'Flaherty's cottage, O'Flaherty refuses to pay the fine, as he feels he has done nothing wrong, nor will he allow O'Feeney to pay it for him. Instead, he heads off to prison.

A Minute's Wait
A train pulls up to the Dunfaill station in County Kerry, where Paddy Morrisey (Jimmy O'Dea) announces there will be "a minute's wait". The passengers and crew crowd into the bar for refreshments, served by Pegeen Mallory (Maureen Potter). Later, Paddy finally proposes to his longtime girlfriend Pegeen.

Mrs. Falsey (May Craig) chats with her old friend Barney Domigan (Harold Goldblatt), while her niece Mary Ann MacMahon (Maureen Connell) becomes acquainted with his son Christy (Godfrey Quigley). Domigan is on his way to arrange a marriage between Christy and a young woman with a substantial dowry. Mrs. Falsey persuades him to change his mind by informing him that the U.S. Army has awarded Mary Ann $10,000 for her father's death in battle. The young couple, unaware of this development, insist they will only marry each other.

Meanwhile, the train is repeatedly delayed, much to the befuddlement of an older English couple (Anita Sharp-Bolster and Michael Trubshawe). They are first displaced from their first class compartment to make way for a prize-winning goat. Then, they have to share their new compartment with lobsters intended for the bishop's golden jubilee. Finally, the bar receives a phone call asking that the train add on another car needed to accommodate a hurling team whose bus has broken down nearby after a match. When the English couple finally get off for some tea, they are left behind when the train finally departs.

1921
Sean Curran (Donal Donnelly) awaits his execution in Galway prison by the British during the "Black and Tan War". This is very unpopular with the Irish public who consider him a hero. A sizable crowd of nuns and other demonstrators continually parade around, chanting the rosary. The British warden (Joseph O'Dea) allows two "nuns" (Doreen Madden and Maureen Cusack), one of them claiming to be Curran's grieving "sister", to visit him briefly; the false sister (an American citizen) swaps clothes and places with Curran in his cell while the lights have gone out during a deliberately staged power outage. Unsuspecting Police Sergeant Michael O'Hara (Denis O'Dea) helps the pair exit into a waiting carriage. He notices that one is wearing high heels, but thinks little of it. When the executioner comes, Curran's false sister is revealed, but as an American, she is immune from arrest.

The city is immediately sealed off as the manhunt for the fugitive begins. O'Hara is assigned to watch a section of the waterfront and daydreams of what he could do with the £500 bounty. Already conflicted by divided loyalties, he is visited by his overtly nationalistic wife (Eileen Crowe). Then, fugitive Curran shows up in the evening disguised as itinerant ballad singer Jimmy Walsh. O'Hara is suspicious and has him sing; Curran chooses the patriotic "The Rising of the Moon". Despite his unconvincing rendition, he manages to slip away on a boat sent for him while O'Hara bickers with his wife. When the policeman sees Curran getting away, he starts to raise the alarm, then reconsiders and starts singing "The Rising of the Moon" himself.

Cast
 Tyrone Power as Introducer

The Majesty of the Law
 Cyril Cusack as Inspector Dillon
 Noel Purcell as Dan O'Flaherty
 Jack MacGowran as Mickey J.
 John Cowley as Phelim O'Feeney
 Paul Farrell and Eric Gorman as the neighbours

A Minute's Wait
 Jimmy O'Dea as Paddy Morrisey, the porter
 Tony Quinn as Mr. Roark, the station master
 J. G. Devlin as Mr. Moran, the guard
 Maureen Potter as Pegeen Mallory
 Paul Farrell as Mr. O'Brien, the train engineer
 Harold Goldblatt as Barney Domigan, a matchmaking father
 May Craig as Mrs. Falsey, a matchmaking aunt
 Godfrey Quigley as Christy Domigan
 Maureen Connell as Mary Ann McMahon
 Michael Trubshawe as Colonel Frobisher
 Anita Sharp-Bolster as Mrs. Frobisher
 Anne D'Alton as Fisherwoman
 Michael O'Duffy as The Singer

1921
 Denis O'Dea as Police Sergeant Michael O'Hara
 Eileen Crowe as Police Sergeant's Wife
 Donal Donnelly as Sean Curran
 Maureen Cusack as "Sister Mary Grace"
 Doreen Madden as "Sister Matthias"
 Joseph O'Dea as British Warden
 Maureen Delany as Old Woman
 Frank Lawton as British Officer
 Edward Lexy as Quartermaster Sergeant

See also
 List of American films of 1957

References

External links

1957 films
1957 drama films
1957 comedy-drama films
Irish comedy-drama films
Anthology films
Irish black-and-white films
Films directed by John Ford
Warner Bros. films
Rail transport films
Films set in Ireland
Films set in 1921
1957 comedy films
1950s English-language films